WFHS may refer to:

 WFHS-LP, a radio station licensed to Louisville, Kentucky, United States
 West Florida High School of Advanced Technology, Pensacola, Florida, United States
 West Forsyth High School (Georgia), Cumming, Georgia, United States
 West Forsyth High School (North Carolina), Clemens, North Carolina, United States
 West Franklin High School, Pomona, Kansas, United States
 Wichita Falls High School, Wichita Falls, Texas, United States
 William Floyd High School, Brookhaven, New York, United States
 Williams Field High School, Gilbert, Arizona, United States
 Windsor Forest High School, Savannah, Georgia, United States
 West Fargo High School, West Fargo, North Dakota, United States